"Would?" is a song by Alice in Chains, written by guitarist and vocalist Jerry Cantrell as a tribute to his friend Andrew Wood, lead vocalist of Mother Love Bone, who died in 1990. Cantrell sings the verses of the song, while Layne Staley sings the chorus.

The song first appeared on the soundtrack to the 1992 film Singles—where the members of Alice in Chains make a cameo appearance—and later appeared on the band's second studio album Dirt, also released in 1992. "Would?" was released as a single and peaked at No. 31 on Billboard'''s Mainstream Rock Tracks chart in 1992, at No. 19 in 1996, and in 2019 the song peaked at No. 15 on the Hot Rock Songs chart after it was featured in the trailer for the season 2 of the Netflix show The Punisher. The song was included on the compilation albums Nothing Safe: Best of the Box (1999), Music Bank (1999), Greatest Hits (2001), and The Essential Alice in Chains (2006). An acoustic version performed on Alice in Chains' MTV Unplugged in 1996 was released in a live album and DVD. In 2009, "Would?" was named the 88th Best Hard Rock Song of All Time by VH1.

Lyrics
The song, written by guitarist/co-vocalist Jerry Cantrell, concerns the late lead singer of Mother Love Bone, Andrew Wood, who died of a heroin overdose in 1990. It was produced, engineered, and mixed by Dave Jerden.

In the liner notes of 1999's Music Bank box set collection, Jerry Cantrell said of the song:
I was thinking a lot about Andrew Wood at the time. We always had a great time when we did hang out, much like Chris Cornell and I do. There was never really a serious moment or conversation, it was all fun. Andy was a hilarious guy, full of life and it was really sad to lose him. But I always hate people who judge the decisions others make. So it was also directed towards people who pass judgments.

Reflecting on the song in a 2017 interview, Cantrell said:
A really significant thing for all of us - was kind of a heavier foreshadowing of some things that would directly affect us and our friends - was the death of Andy Wood. That song was me thinking about him like we all did, and trying to put that down and just kind of write a little ode for him. Because he wasn't there, and everything was taking off... It was a nice thing to be able to use that song, it was very poignant I thought, because we kind of carried him with us.

Release and reception
“Would?” was released as a single in 1992, coinciding with the release of the movie Singles. The song peaked at number 31 on the Billboard Mainstream Rock Tracks chart. The UK single was released in January 1993 and reached the Top 20 in the UK and the Top 40 in the Netherlands. It is one of the band's best-known songs.

Steve Huey of AllMusic said that the song is "a touch more melancholy than many of the group's best-known rockers" and "one of the band's most fully realized individual moments." James Hunter of Rolling Stone called the song "a Seattle song that in 1999 evokes no grunge nostalgia. It's timeless, one of the most stylish singles of the decade, the work of a band which understands that life gets way out of hand but that first-rate rock recordings can't."

The song was named one of the top tracks of the 1990s by Pitchfork Media in 2010. In 2014, the entertainment magazine Paste ranked the song number three on its list of the 50 Best Grunge Songs.

On January 10, 2019, "Would?" was featured in the trailer for the season 2 of the Marvel/Netflix superhero show The Punisher. Following the release of the trailer, the song peaked at No. 15 on Billboard's Hot Rock Songs chart in the week of January 26, 2019.

Music video
The music video for "Would?" was released in 1992 and was co-directed by Cameron Crowe and Josh Taft. The music video won the award for Best Video from a Film at the 1993 MTV Video Music Awards. The video is available on the home video release Music Bank: The Videos.

Live performances
Alice in Chains performed an acoustic version of "Would?" for its appearance on MTV Unplugged in 1996, and the song was included on the Unplugged live album and home video release. Live performances of the song can also be found on the "Heaven Beside You" single and the live album, Live.

Cover versions
The song was covered by Opeth on their single "Burden", a song from their 2008 album Watershed.

Breaking Benjamin also covered the song in February 2020, with guest vocalist Gavin Rossdale of Bush taking Cantrell's parts.

In popular culture
The song was featured in the racing video games Burnout Dominator and Burnout Paradise.

In 2011, fictional band Queens of Dogtown covered "Would?" in the fifth episode of the fourth season of television series Californication.

The song was one of the clues about Alice in Chains (along with "Rooster" and "Man in the Box") in an episode of the game show Jeopardy!'' aired on March 5, 2019.

Track listing

Personnel

Alice in Chains
Layne Staley – lead vocals
Jerry Cantrell – guitar, co-lead vocals
Mike Starr – bass
Sean Kinney – drums

Production
Produced by Alice in Chains
Engineered by Bryan Carlstrom, assisted by Annette Cisneros and Ulrich Wild
Mixed by Dave Jerden, assisted by Annette Cisneros
Mastered by Steve Hall and Eddy Schreyer

Chart positions

Certifications

References

External links
[ Review of "Would?"] at Allmusic

 Usage in film, television and videogames: see "Alice in Chains - Soundtrack. 'Would?'" at the Internet Movie Database

1992 songs
1992 singles
Alice in Chains songs
Songs about drugs
Songs written for films
Songs inspired by deaths
Songs written by Jerry Cantrell
Columbia Records singles